The Diviners is a 1974 novel by Margaret Laurence.

The Diviners may also refer to:

 The Diviners (Libba Bray novel), a 2012 Young Adult book by Libba Bray
 The Diviners (film), a 1993 television film
 The Diviners (play), an American play set in the United States

See also
 Diviners, divination practitioners